Cherokia is a genus of flat-backed millipedes in the family Xystodesmidae. There are at least three described species in Cherokia.

Species
These three species belong to the genus Cherokia:
 Cherokia georgiana (Bollman, 1889)
 Cherokia latassa Hoffman
 Cherokia parvior Chamberlin

References

Further reading

 
 
 Hoffman, Richard L. (1960). "Revision of the Milliped Genus Cherokia (Polydesmida: Xystodesmidae)." Proceedings of the United States National Museum. 112 (3436):227–264, 7 figures, 1 plate. https://doi.org/10.5479/si.00963801.112-3436.227

Polydesmida
Articles created by Qbugbot